"I Do Like to Be Beside the Seaside" is a popular British music hall song. It was written in 1907 by John H. Glover-Kind and made famous by music hall singer Mark Sheridan who first recorded it in 1909. It speaks of the singer's love for the seaside, and his wish to return there for his summer holidays each year. It was composed at a time when the yearly visits of the British working-class to the seaside were booming.

It was, for a long time, used as a signature tune by Reginald Dixon MBE, who was the resident organist at the Tower Ballroom, Blackpool between 1930 and 1970.

Lyrics

References in culture
Cavalcade (1933), starring Diana Wynyard and Clive Brook, shows the song being performed by seaside entertainers in a scene set in 1909.
 Sylvia Scarlett (1935), starring Katharine Hepburn and Cary Grant.
 Bank Holiday (1938), starring Margaret Lockwood and Hugh Williams. The tune is used as a theme several times during the film.
 The Adventures of Sherlock Holmes (1939), starring Basil Rathbone, involves a heavily disguised Holmes singing the song. An anachronism, as the film was set in 1894 thirteen years before the song was written.
 Mr. Moto's Last Warning (1939), starring Peter Lorre and George Sanders. The antagonist's (Ricardo Cortez) ventriloquism act features a dummy singing the song while he drinks a glass of water and smokes a cigarette.
 Carry On... Follow That Camel (1967): when the foreign legionnaires become lost in the North African desert they sing the song.
 Oh What a Lovely War (1969) features a pierside scene where Sir Douglas Haig is trying to recruit for the First World War, with the words of the song changed to "I do to like to see a lot of soldiers".
 The Doctor Who episodes Death to the Daleks and The Leisure Hive feature the song. In the first it was sung by the Doctor (Jon Pertwee) while in the second it was part of the music score of the episode. 
 The opening two sentences in the chorus are included at the end of the song "Seven Seas of Rhye" (1974) from Queen. It is also whistled at the beginning of the song "Brighton Rock" from the album Sheer Heart Attack.
 The Goodies episode "Holidays" (1982) features the song as part of the "Victorian musical evening", at first sung only by Tim Brooke-Taylor, before Graeme Garden and Bill Oddie join in, and it becomes a punk rock song.
 An Awfully Big Adventure (1994), starring Hugh Grant and Alan Rickman, includes a scene where two theatre troupes sing the chorus of the song while riding a bus to a football game.
NCIS Season 7 Episode 18 (2010), starring David McCallum, includes a scene where he is walking by the seaside singing the song.
 In Grand Theft Auto: The Lost and Damned the song is sung near the end of "Off Route" mission by cannibalistic serial killer Curtis Stocker.
The Thomas & Friends Series 18 episode "Thomas the Quarry Engine" (2014) ends with Mavis, Salty, Cranky, Thomas, and Porter singing the song. It is also sung in the Series 19 episode "Toad and the Whale" (2015). An instrumental version is heard in "Thomas & Friends in 4-D: Bubbling Boilers" (2016) on Mr. Bubbles' bubble machine. In the YouTube video "Meet the Steam Team: Rebecca" (2019), she and Gordon sang a parody of the song called "It's Lovely to Pull the Great Express Train".
 In the Hey Duggee Series 2 episode "The Fossil Badge" (2017), a seashell character sings a few lines from the song.
Mr. Bean episodes "Holiday for Teddy" and "A Magic Day Out", Mr. Bean sings the song.
The Vicar of Dibley, Geraldine (played by Dawn French), sings the chorus while intoxicated in the "Merry Christmas" episode (2004).
 In Outlander, Claire Fraser sings a few lines from the song to her stillborn child, Faith, in episode 207, "Faith" (2016).
 The song "Regular" by the band Badfinger features Joey Molland singing two lines from the song during the fade out.
 The punk band The Sex Pistols incorporated this tune on stage in 2008.
 In the Rainbow episode "The Seaside Show" (1991), the characters sing the song as part of their show.
 The song has been used as an entrance theme by professional wrestler William Regal.

References

External links
 
 

Songs about beaches
1907 songs
Music hall songs
Pinky and Perky songs